Groupe Rossel (full name : Rossel & Cie, S.A.) is a major media group in Brussels and Wallonia, the French-speaking part of Belgium. The daily newspaper Le Soir is one of their main and most successful publications. The other daily the company owns is the subsidiary SudPresse, which publishes daily newspapers including  La Capitale and La Meuse. Together with De Persgroep, Rossel purchased the two broadsheets De Tijd and L'Echo, and merged them into the new Mediafin. Rossel also owns several French newspapers, including La Voix du Nord. Rossel led a consortium that acquired the French magazines Psychologies and Première.

References

External links

 Rossel Advertising sales house
 le Soir, published by Rossel
 Sud Presse, part of Rossel group
 Immo Vlan site, part of Rossel group
 Vlan used cars site, part of Rossel group
 Vlan classifieds, part of Rossel group

Mass media companies of Belgium
Mass media in Brussels
Companies based in Brussels